The Alfred J. Comeau House is a historic house at 701 Flamingo Drive in West Palm Beach, Florida, United States. On March 24, 2000, it was added to the U.S. National Register of Historic Places and is a contributing property to the Flamingo Park Historic Residential District.

References

External links

 Palm Beach County listings at National Register of Historic Places

Houses on the National Register of Historic Places in Florida
National Register of Historic Places in Palm Beach County, Florida
Houses in Palm Beach County, Florida